Phocaea or Phokaia (Ancient Greek: Φώκαια, Phókaia; modern-day Foça in Turkey) was an ancient Ionian Greek city on the western coast of Anatolia. Greek colonists from Phocaea founded the colony of Massalia (modern-day Marseille, in France) in 600 BC, Emporion (modern-day Empúries, in Catalonia, Spain) in 575 BC and Elea (modern-day Velia, in Campania, Italy) in 540 BC.

Geography
Phocaea was the northernmost of the Ionian cities, on the boundary with Aeolis. It was located near the mouth of the river Hermus (now Gediz), and situated on the coast of the peninsula separating the Gulf of Cyme to the north, named for the largest of the Aeolian cities, and the Gulf of Smyrna (now İzmir) to the south.

Phocaea had two natural harbours within close range of the settlement, both containing a number of small islands. Phocaea's harbours allowed it to develop a thriving seafaring economy, and to become a great naval power, which greatly influenced its culture.

Recent archaeological surveys have shown that the city of Phocaea was large for the archaic period. Herodotus gives an idea of the size of Phocaea by describing the walls of Phocaea as having a length of several stadia.

Four steps between the two levels suggest strong Persian influence and most archaeologists believe this tomb was built for a Persian aristocrat or local leader serving the Persians. Compare the style of the tomb of Cyrus.

History

The ancient Greek geographer Pausanias says that Phocaea was founded by Phocians under Athenian leadership, on land given to them by the Aeolian Cymaeans, and that they were admitted into the Ionian League after accepting as kings the line of Codrus. Pottery remains indicate Aeolian presence as late as the 9th century BC, and Ionian presence as early as the end of the 9th century BC. From this an approximate date of settlement for Phocaea can be inferred.

According to Herodotus the Phocaeans were the first Greeks to make long sea-voyages, having discovered the coasts of the Adriatic, Tyrrhenia and Spain. Herodotus relates that they so impressed Arganthonios, king of Tartessus in Spain, that he invited them to settle there, and, when they declined, gave them a great sum of money to build a wall around their city.

Their sea travel was extensive. To the south they probably conducted trade with the Greek colony of Naucratis in Egypt, which was the colony of their fellow Ionian city Miletus. To the north, they probably helped settle Amisos (Samsun) on the Black Sea, and Lampsacus at the north end of the Hellespont (now the Dardanelles). However Phocaea's major colonies were to the west. These included Alalia in Corsica, Emporiae and Rhoda in Spain, and especially Massalia (Marseille) in France.

Phocaea remained independent until the reign of the Lydian king Croesus (circa 560–545 BC), when they, along with the rest of mainland Ionia, first, fell under Lydian control and then, along with Lydia (who had allied itself with Sparta) were conquered by Cyrus the Great of Persia in 546 BC, in one of the opening skirmishes of the great Greco-Persian conflict.

Rather than submit to Persian rule, the Phocaeans abandoned their city. Some may have fled to Chios, others to their colonies on Corsica and elsewhere in the Mediterranean, with some eventually returning to Phocaea. Many however became the founders of Elea, around 540 BC.

In 500 BC, Phocaea joined the Ionian Revolt against Persia. Indicative of its naval prowess, Dionysius, a Phocaean was chosen to command the Ionian fleet at the decisive Battle of Lade, in 494 BC. However, indicative of its declining fortunes, Phocaea was only able to contribute three ships, out of a total of "three hundred and fifty three". The Ionian fleet was defeated and the revolt ended shortly thereafter.

After the defeat of Xerxes I by the Greeks in 480 BC and the subsequent rise of Athenian power, Phocaea joined the Delian League, paying tribute to Athens of two talents.  In 412 BC, during the Peloponnesian War, with the help of Sparta, Phocaea rebelled along with the rest of Ionia. The Peace of Antalcidas, which ended the Corinthian War, returned nominal control to Persia in 387 BC.

In 343 BC, the Phocaeans unsuccessfully laid siege to Kydonia on the island of Crete.

During the Hellenistic period it fell under Seleucid, then Attalid rule. In the Roman period, the town was a manufacturing center for ceramic vessels, including the late Roman Phocaean red slip.

It was later under the control of Benedetto Zaccaria, the Genoese ambassador to Byzantium, who received the town as a hereditary lordship; Zaccaria and his descendants amassed a considerable fortune from his properties there, especially the rich alum mines. It remained a Genoese colony until it was taken by the Turks in 1455. It is a titular see of the Roman Catholic Church.

In 1914, Phocaea was the location of a massacre against ethnic Greek civilians by Turkish irregular bands.

Coinage

Probably following the Lydians, the Phocaeans were among the earliest in the world to make and use coins as money. Its earliest coins were made of electrum, a naturally occurring alloy of silver and gold. The British Museum has a Phocaean coin containing the image of a seal dating from 600 to 550 BC.

See also
Cyme (Aeolis)
25 Phocaea, an asteroid named after the city
List of ancient Greek cities

Notes

References

Herodotus, The Persian Wars, Translated by A. D. Godley, (Loeb Classical Library, Nos. 117–120), Cambridge, Massachusetts, Harvard University Press (1920)    . 
Pausanias, Description of Greece, Books I-II, translated by Horace Leonard Jones; Cambridge, Massachusetts: Harvard University Press; London, William Heinemann Ltd. (1918) . 
Pliny the Elder, The Natural History (Eds. John Bostock, M.D., F.R.S. H.T. Riley, Esq., B.A.) London. Taylor and Francis, Red Lion Court, Fleet Street. (1855). 
Stillwell, Richard, The Princeton Encyclopedia of Classical Sites, (Editors: Richard Stillwell, William L. MacDonald and Marian Holland McAllister) (1976). . 
Strabo, Geography, translated by Horace Leonard Jones; Cambridge, Massachusetts: Harvard University Press; London: William Heinemann, Ltd. (1924). Vol. 3, Books 6–7 , Vol. 6, Books 13–14 .

External links

British Museum:
"Gold ring engraved with a woman at an altar", circa 350 BC, Phocaea
"Silver stater, with turtle", late 6th century BC
Perseus Coin Catalog: "Dewing 2304", Phocaea, circa 477 BC–388 BC
Obverse: Helmeted head of Athena, profile to the left; below, seal
Reverse: Quadripartite incuse square
Catalog of Greek Coins of Ionia:
 Plate IV: Ionian Electrum, Phocaea, 6th, 5th and 4th century BC
 Plate V: Ionian Electrum, Phocaea, 5th and 4th century BC

 
States and territories established in the 9th century BC
9th-century BC establishments
Populated places in ancient Ionia
Former populated places in Turkey
Populated places established in the 9th century BC
Achaemenid ports
Ancient Greek archaeological sites in Turkey
Catholic titular sees in Asia
Geography of İzmir Province
History of İzmir Province
Members of the Delian League
Greek city-states
Foça District